Lulom (also Romanized as Lūlom; also known as Leylom) is a village in Chehel Chay Rural District, in the Central District of Minudasht County, Golestan Province, Iran. At the 2006 census, its population was 41, in 9 families.

References 

Populated places in Minudasht County